Chaco is a volcano in Chile.

It is part of the Central Volcanic Zone of Chile, which since the Miocene has generated large volcanic edifices. Lava flow features such as individual blocks and the flow front have been well preserved by the arid climate of the region. Later two of the sector collapses were found to be nonexistent, with one scarp being of glacial origin and another landslide deposit being a pyroclastic deposit.

Chaco has principally erupted andesite, which contains hornblende, orthopyroxene and plagioclase, but also biotite within lava dome forming andesites. Some hydrothermal alteration has taken place in the central part of the volcano. Radiometric dating has yielded ages of 17.0 - 15.5 million years ago.

References

External links 

 

Miocene volcanoes
Volcanoes of Chile